Chibuike Iteogu (born 24 November 1985) is a Nigerian cricketer. In September 2018, he was named in Nigeria's squad for the 2018 Africa T20 Cup. He made his Twenty20 debut for Nigeria in the 2018 Africa T20 Cup on 15 September 2018.

References

External links
 

1985 births
Living people
Nigerian cricketers
Place of birth missing (living people)